Events in the year 1968 in Germany.

Incumbents
President – Heinrich Lübke 
Chancellor – Kurt Georg Kiesinger

Events
 Germany in the Eurovision Song Contest 1968
 May 30 - German Emergency Acts
 June 21 - July 2 - 18th Berlin International Film Festival
 June 27-October 4 - 4. documenta
 Neue Nationalgalerie opened in Berlin.

Births
 March 6 - Smudo, German singer
 April 6 - Oliver Korittke, German actor
 April 8 - Gabriele Fähnrich, German gymnast
 April 20 - Jens Weidmann, German economist, president of the Deutsche Bundesbank, and Chairman of the Board of the Bank for International Settlements
 April 21 - Tita von Hardenberg, German journalist and television presenter
 April 25 - Thomas Strunz, German football player
 April 29 - Michael Herbig, German film actor and director
 April 29 - Jürgen Vogel, German actor
 May 1 - Oliver Bierhoff, German football player
 May 2 - August François von Finck, German businessman
 May 5 - Peter Frank, German lawyer
 May 9 - Hardy Krüger Jr., German actor
 May 19 - Sonja Zietlow, German television presenter
 June 8 - Torsten Gutsche, German canoeist
 August 2 - Stefan Effenberg, German football player
 August 17 - Anja Fichtel, German fencer
 September 11 - Andreas Tews, German boxer
 September 23 - Gabriele Reinsch, German athlete
 September 29 - Svenja Schulze, German politician
 October 13 - Kay Bluhm, German canoeist
 October 18 - Michael Stich, German tennis player
 November 19 - Katarina Barley, German politician
 November 21 - Inka Bause, German actress, singer and television presenter
 November 24 - Martin Schneider, German footballer
 December 18 - Mario Basler, German footballer
 December 30 - Thomas D, German singer

Deaths
January 2 - Cuno Hoffmeister, German astronomer (born 1892)
February 23 - Emil Hirschfeld, German athlete (born 1903)
February 28 - Hans Lohmeyer, German politician and jurist (born 1881)
April 16 — Albert Betz, German physicist and a pioneer of wind turbine technology (born 1885)
May 25 - Georg von Küchler, German field marshal (born 1881)
May 30 - Louis, Prince of Hesse and by Rhine (born 1908)
June 18 - Nikolaus von Falkenhorst, German general (born 1885)
June 23 — Andreas von Aulock, Imperial Army officer and Wehrmacht general (born 1893)
July 1 - Fritz Bauer, German judge (born 1903)
July 19 - Käthe Kruse notable pioneer of German doll-making  (born 1883)
July 20 - Joseph Keilberth, German conductor (born 1908)
July 28 - Otto Hahn, German chemist (born 1879)
December 16 - Jürgen Moll, German football player (born 1939)

References

 
Years of the 20th century in Germany
1960s in Germany
Germany
Germany